Caaguazú  is a district and city in the department of the same name in Paraguay.

Demographics
According to the INE (the local census bureau), the urban area itself has a population of 63,000, while the district has a total of 127,328 inhabitants.

Economy
Caaguazú had the greatest concentration of sawmills in Paraguay about fifteen to twenty years ago and up until today is still called the “Wood Capital” of Paraguay, in Spanish (Capital de la Madera). Caaguazú still has more than ten big wood industries producing wood flooring among other things.  The many sawmills have mostly move up to the north eastern part of Paraguay where there are many more logs.

Transportation
National routes PY02 and  PY13 pass through the city. The closest airport to the district is Guaraní International Airport (AGT). Distance from the airport to Caaguazú is about 120 kilometers.

References

External links
 www.caaguazu.com.py El mayor Portal de Contenido de Caaguazú - República del Paraguay.
 infoCaaguazu.com Página de noticias, información cultural y comercial de Caaguazú.
 Coord. geográficas e imágenes satelitales
 Pagina de la Municipalidad de Caaguazú
 Información sobre La Ruta de la Mentira en Caaguazu